Mark Casey may refer to:

 Mark Casey (footballer) (born 1982), Scottish footballer
 Mark Casey (bowls) (born 1982), Australian lawn bowler